Jazsmin Lewis (born March 22) is an American actress, film producer and musician. Lewis is best known for her starring role as the title character in the 2005 film Traci Townsend and as Jennifer Palmer, Calvin's wife in the Barbershop film series.

Biography
Lewis began her professional career in music during her high school years, which included singing and playing guitar for musical acts George Clinton and The Ohio Players. After her music career, Lewis relocated to Los Angeles where she received roles on television shows such as, Saved by the Bell, The Wayans Brothers, Eve and Living Single. Lewis is also known for being the Coors Light spokes-model during 2001 and 2002.

Lewis portrayed the title character in Traci Townsend in 2005. For her role, Lewis won the 2006 award for the Best Acting Performance Award at the 2006 Boston International Film Festival. In addition to the Boston award, Lewis also won the Audience Choice Award winner at the 2006 Hollywood Black Film Festival for the aforementioned role that same year.

Filmography

Film and TV Movies

Television

References

External links

Jazsmin Lewis MySpace

Jazsmin Lewis Facebook

Living people
20th-century American actresses
21st-century American actresses
American film actresses
American television actresses
Actresses from Cleveland
African-American actresses
20th-century African-American women
20th-century African-American people
21st-century African-American women
21st-century African-American people
Year of birth missing (living people)